Desirée Sparre-Enger (born June 25, 1976), mostly known by her stage name Bambee, is a Norwegian bubblegum dance singer from Nordstrand, Oslo. She was born in the Solomon Islands to a Grenadian mother and a Norwegian father. She used the name Bambee as a reference to her eyes, comparable to those of a deer. Originally she considered using the name Bambi but changed the spelling to avoid copyright issues. Several of her more popular songs, including "Cowgirl", "Seventeen" and "Bumble Bee", have appeared on the Dance Dance Revolution game series. She has also made her songs available for In the Groove 2.

Bambee's debut album On Ice released in December 1999 in Japan and then in Norway in April 2000, where it peaked at #33 on VG-lista. Her second album Fairytales released in June 2001. In 2002, a third album was in the works for Bambee, but for unknown reasons, possibly due to the decline of sales in the Bubblegum Dance market, the album was shelved.

Discography

Albums
On Ice (1999/2000)
Fairytales (2001)

Singles
"Candy Girl" (1997)
"Bam Bam Bam" (1998)
"Typical Tropical" (1999)
"You Are My Dream" (1999)
"Bumble Bee" (2000)
"Seventeen" (2001)
"Cowgirl" (2001)
"Watch Out" (2001)

Video games
Bambee has a total of 4 songs which appear in the Dance Dance Revolution arcade series. In the Groove 2 and StepManiaX also feature two of these songs, plus "Baby Baby" (in In the Groove 2 only) and "Spaceman" (from Bambee and Lynn).

A yellow check mark indicates:
 For 3rdMix: only the 3rdMix Plus edition includes "Bumble Bee".
 For In the Groove 2: "Spaceman" is credited to Lynn.

References

External links
Bambee discography at Discogs
Bambee at Bubblegum Dancer

Eurodance musicians
Video game musicians
Norwegian pop singers
Living people
1976 births
21st-century Norwegian singers
21st-century Norwegian women singers